Joseph Mayer may refer to:

Joseph Mayer (antiquary) (1803–1886), English goldsmith, antiquary and collector
Joseph Edward Mayer (1904–1983), American chemist
Joseph Mayer (cricketer) (1902–1981), English first-class cricketer who played with Warwickshire
Joseph Mayer (politician) (1877–1942), American Republican Party politician
Joseph L. Mayer (c. 1875–1933), American chemist
Joe Mayer (1846–1909), American businessman and gold prospector

See also
Joseph Meyer (disambiguation)
Joe Meyers (disambiguation)
Josef Mayr (1900-1957), mayor of Augsburg, Germany